Coleophora aculeata is a moth of the family Coleophoridae.

References

aculeata
Moths described in 1994